Akron City FC is an American soccer club based in Akron, Ohio, United States.

Founded in 2021, the men's team plays in the National Premier Soccer League (NPSL), a national semi-pro league at the fourth tier of the American Soccer Pyramid, in the Rust Belt Conference of the Midwest Region. The team plays its home games at Green Street Stadium on the campus of St. Vincent–St. Mary High School in Akron. The team's colors are sky blue, red and white.

History

Founding and inaugural season
Akron City FC joined the NPSL as an expansion franchise in 2021 and took part in its first competitive season in 2022. On September 16, 2021, Kia Zolgharnain was named as the technical director and was responsible for player acquisition for the new team. Akron City played their first NPSL game on May 14, 2022. In front of 1,051 fans, the team secured a 2–1 victory over Pittsburgh Hotspurs.

The team would not win again until its final game on July 15, 2022 against the Erie Commodores. Kia stepped down as head coach after three games due to medical reasons and assistant coach Jay Stepp assumed head coaching duties for the reaming of the season. Cedric Tschami was elevated to top assistant. Despite the team's final record, four of their losses were by one goal and they played to four draws. One of those draws was against eventual Rust Belt champion and Midwest Region finalist Cleveland SC, avenging their two worst losses of the season. In that game, Akron City FC scored early and held a 1-0 lead for over 70 minutes before conceding the equalizer in the 86th minute. 

Despite the results on the field, the 2022 season was a great building block for the future. The team drew over 1,000 fans twice and averaged 625 fans for the season, well above league averages. The team secured 19 sponsorships, proving the business community was on board with the cities newest sports asset.

Kit manufacturers
2022–: UN1TUS
2023–: UN1TUS

Shirt sponsors
2022–: Hoppin' Frog Brewery, Springside Athletic Club, Cleveland Clinic Akron General, Circle K
2023–: Sgt. Clean Car Wash, TL Worldwide Transportation, Circle K, Cleveland Clinic Akron General, Hoppin' Frog Brewery

Players and staff

Current roster
2022 Inaugural Season Roster

Current Standings

NPSL Rust Belt Conference

Year-by-year

Managerial history

Stadium
 Green Street Stadium, St. Vincent–St. Mary High School;Akron, Ohio (2022–present)

References

External links
 Official website
 Twitter
 Instagram

Association football clubs established in 2021
Sports in Akron, Ohio
2021 establishments in Ohio
Soccer clubs in Ohio